Otway is a surname. Notable people with the surname include:

 Arthur John Otway (1822–1891), Member of Parliament
 Caesar Otway (1780–1842), Irish clergyman and writer
 Charles James Otway (1694-1764), British general
 Frank Otway (1923–2022) American professional basketball player
 John Otway (born 1952), British singer, songwriter, and humorist
 Lee Otway (born 1982), British singer and actor
 Robert Otway (1770–1846), British admiral
 Terence Otway (1914–2006), Commander of Airborne Forces, D-Day
 Thomas Otway (1652–1685), English dramatist
 Thomas Otway (bishop) (1615–1692), Anglican bishop in Ireland
 Wayne Otway (born 1956) Australian rules football player